Arani is a province in Cochabamba Department, Bolivia. Its capital is Arani, situated about 53 km from Cochabamba. Arani is known for its bread and its artisan wickerwork.

Geography 
Some of the highest mountains of the province are listed below:

Subdivision 
The province is divided into two municipalities which are further subdivided into four cantons.

Arani Municipality consists of three cantons, Arani, Pocoata and Collpaciaco. Vacas Municipality is not further subdivided, so Vacas Canton and Vacas Municipality are identical.

Population 
The people in the Arani Province are mainly indigenous citizens of Quechua descent.

Languages 
The languages spoken in the Arani Province are mainly Quechua and Spanish. The following table shows the number of those belonging to the recognized group of speakers.

Tourism 
Festivals and Fairs:
 August 14–15: Saint Isidore the Laborer in  Qullpayaku, 2 days
 August 24–25: Virgen la Bella in Arani, 2 days
 September 20: Farmers' fair in Tacopaya, 1 day
 3rd week in November: Bread fair in Arani, 1 day
 December 4: Saint Barbara in Vacas

Other tourist attractions include the church of Saint Bartholomew (San Bartolomé) in Arani, built in 1610, which is dedicated to the Virgen la Bella, and the lakes in Vacas Municipality: Parqu Qucha, Asiru Qucha, Junt'utuyu, Pilawit'u, Qullpa Qucha and Yanatama.

See also 
 Ismael Montes Teacher Training College

References 

 www.bolivia-online.net

External links 

 Map of Arani Province

Provinces of Cochabamba Department